The electoral regions of Mexico (circunscripciones electorales) are geographic areas composed of various states used for the election of the 200 proportional representation legislators to the Chamber of Deputies.

Mexico is split into 5 separate regions. Each of the five regions sends 40 deputies, which are selected according to party lists in the regions.

The electoral regions are divided to ensure a roughly equal distribution of population among the regions and may be modified by the National Electoral Institute. The current distribution has been in use since September 30, 2005.

See also 
National Electoral Institute
Chamber of Deputies (Mexico)
Elections in Mexico

External links
Electoral Regions on the INE website

Politics of Mexico
Elections in Mexico
Mexico, PR
Mexico politics-related lists